The 1933 Arizona State Bulldogs football team was an American football team that represented Arizona State Teachers College (later renamed Arizona State University) in the Border Conference during the 1933 college football season. The Bulldogs compiled a 3–5 record (1–3 against Border opponents) and were outscored by their opponents by a combined total of 125 to 73. 

Rudy Lavik was hired as the team's head coach in July 1933, replacing Ted Shipkey. Lavik had previously served for six years as the football coach at Arizona State Teachers College at Flagstaff (later renamed Northern Arizona University); prior to that, Lavik coached at Colorado State Agricultural College in Fort Collins. 

The team captain was Paul Griffin. Earl Pomeroy was an assistant coach. The Bulldogs finished 2–2 at home and 1–3 on the road. With the exception of the Fresno State game that was played in Phoenix, home games were played at Irish Field in Tempe, Arizona.

Schedule

Game summaries
On September 29, Arizona State lost its season opener on the road against the Whittier College Poets by a 27–0 score.

On October 7, the Bulldogs lost to the San Diego Marines, 26–0, at Sports Field in San Diego.  It was the first meeting between the two football programs.

On October 21, Arizona State delivered a 26–13 road win at New Mexico.

On October 28, the Bulldogs fell 13–0 on the road against Arizona State-Flagstaff (later renamed Northern Arizona University).

On November 4, in their home opener, Arizona State defeated Fresno State, 21–7, at the high school stadium in Phoenix.

On November 11, the Bulldogs earned their second consecutive win with a 19–7 victory over New Mexico A&M (later renamed New Mexico State University) before a crowd of 3,000 persons in Tempe.

On November 18, in the Arizona–Arizona State football rivalry game in Tempe, Arizona State lost to Arizona, 26–7, in front of 6,000 spectators at Phoenix.

On November 30 (Thanksgiving Day), the Bulldogs were shut out, 6–0, by Arizona State-Flagstaff at Irish Field.

Roster
The usual Arizona State lineup included left end Landon Hardesty, left tackle Anson Cooper, left guard Clarence Sexton, center Bill Boyle, right guard Claude Duval, right tackle Elton Harper, right end Tom Lillico, quarterback John McTeeley, halfbacks Wendell Pickens and Cyrus Lusher, and fullback Bill Baxter.

Sidney Anderson, William Ball, Johnny Burke, Lowell Callahan, George Ellingson, Bert Fireman, Vomen Fry, Meryl Furrey, Maurice Graham, London Hardesty, Leon Jones, and Heber Kleinman were also on the roster.

Awards and honors
Fullback Bill Baxter earned first-team All-Border Conference honors for the 1933 football season.

References

Arizona State
Arizona State Sun Devils football seasons
Arizona State Sun Devils football